SM UB-8 was a German Type UB I submarine or U-boat in the German Imperial Navy during World War I. She was sold to Bulgaria in 1916 and renamed Podvodnik No. 18, and was the first ever Bulgarian submarine.

UB-8 was ordered in October 1914 and was laid down at the AG Weser shipyard in Bremen in November. She carried two torpedoes for her two bow torpedo tubes and was also armed with a deck-mounted machine gun. UB-8 was originally one of a pair of UB I boats sent to the Austro-Hungarian Navy to replace an Austrian pair to be sent to the Dardanelles, and was broken into sections and shipped by rail to Pola in March 1915 for reassembly. She was launched and commissioned as SM UB-8 in the German Imperial Navy in April when the Austrians opted out of the agreement.

Although briefly a part of the Pola Flotilla at commissioning, UB-8 spent the majority of her German career patrolling the Black Sea as part of the Constantinople Flotilla. The U-boat sank only one ship, was disguised by the British Admiralty as a Royal Navy battlecruiser as part of a decoy operation. In October, she helped repel a Russian bombardment of Bulgaria.

In May 1916, the submarine was transferred to the Bulgarian Navy as Podvodnik No. 18 and commissioned in a ceremony that was attended by Crown Prince Boris and Prince Kiril. In Bulgarian service, the submarine patrolled the Bulgarian Black Sea coast and had encounters with Russian vessels on several occasions. After the war ended, the submarine was surrendered to France in February 1919 and scrapped at Bizerta in August 1921. However, in July 2011 Viceadmiral Manushev, Commander of the Bulgarian Navy, announced that the submarine, discovered in 2010 at the sea bottom near the town of Varna, is UB-8. Divers discovered manufacturer numbers and according to them the identity is confirmed.

Design and construction 
After the German Army's rapid advance along the North Sea coast in the earliest stages of World War I, the German Imperial Navy found itself without suitable submarines that could be operated in the narrow and shallow seas off Flanders. Project 34, a design effort begun in mid-August 1914, produced the Type UB I design: a small submarine that could be shipped by rail to a port of operations and quickly assembled. UB-8 was last boat of the initial allotment of eight submarines—numbered from —ordered on 15 October from Germaniawerft of Kiel, just shy of two months after planning for the class began.

UB-8 was laid down by Germaniawerft in Kiel on 4 December. She had a single  Daimler 4-cylinder diesel engine for surface travel, and a single  Siemens-Schuckert electric motor for underwater travel, both attached to a single propeller shaft.

UB-8 was armed with two  torpedoes in two bow torpedo tubes. She was also outfitted for a single  machine gun on deck. UB-8s standard complement consisted of one officer and thirteen enlisted men.

While UB-8s construction neared completion in early March 1915, Enver Pasha and other Turkish leaders were pleading with their German and Austro-Hungarian allies to send submarines to the Dardanelles to help attack the British and French fleet pounding Turkish positions.

When work on UB-7 and UB-8 was complete at the Germaniwerft yard, they were both readied for rail shipment. The process of shipping a UB I boat involved breaking the submarine down into what was essentially a knock down kit. Each boat was broken into approximately fifteen pieces and loaded onto eight railway flatcars. The boats were ready for shipment to the main Austrian naval base at Pola on 15 March, despite the fact that the Austrian pair was still not ready. German engineers and technicians that accompanied the German boats to Pola worked under the supervision of Kapitänleutnant Hans Adam, head of the newly created U-boat special command. Typically, the UB I assembly process took about two to three weeks, and, accordingly, UB-8 was launched at Pola sometime in April.

German career 
During her trials, UB-8 was assigned the Austrian number of U-8 and an Austrian commander. Her German crew at Pola—since it was still the intent for UB-8 to be transferred to the K.u.K. Kriegsmarine—wore either civilian clothes or Austrian uniforms. As time dragged on, the Austrian U-3 and U-4 were still not ready, and eventually Admiral Anton Haus, the head of the Austro-Hungarian Navy, reneged on his commitment because of the overt hostility from neighbor and former ally Italy.

With the change of heart from the Austrians, Germany resolved to retain UB-8 and send her to the aid of the Turks. So, the boat was commissioned into the German Imperial Navy as SM UB-8 on 23 April under the command of Kapitänleutnant Ernst von Voigt, a 27-year-old first-time U-boat commander. At commissioning, the boat temporarily joined the Pola Flotilla.

Because of her limited range, UB-8 would not have been able to make the entire journey to Turkey, so on 2 May, she was towed by the Austrian cruiser  from Pola down the Adriatic and through the Straits of Otranto. The duo continued until spotted by French forces near Kefalonia. UB-8 slipped the tow and Novara raced back into the Adriatic without incident. Two days after her departure, UB-8 was running on the surface when the stern of the boat suddenly dropped. The watch officer, on the conning tower with the helmsman and a lookout, was able to partially close the hatch before the entire submarine slipped below the waves, depositing the three men in the water. On board the submarine, water continued to pour in through the hatch and the boat was sinking by the stern. Voigt ordered the interior hatch to the control room sealed and all the ballast tanks filled with compressed air to increase buoyancy. The tactic returned UB-8 to the surface where the boat's diesel engines were restarted. Voigt circled back for the missing crewmen but only the watch officer and helmsman were recovered; the lookout had drowned.

On 29 May 1915, UB-8 came upon an Allied convoy near Lemnos, and, enticed by the prospect of hitting what he identified as the Royal Navy battlecruiser , Voigt allowed five fully laden transport ships to pass unmolested. When he had a clear shot, Voigt launched one of his torpedoes at the stationary ship and hit it, sending debris into the air. Unfortunately for Voigt and UB-8, they had in fact torpedoed the British ocean liner , which was a participant in an Admiralty plan to disguise large liners as Royal Navy capital ships. Merion, which eventually sank on 31 May, had been outfitted with wood and canvas "guns" and overloaded with cement and stones to approximate the profile of Tiger. There are no reports of any deaths during Merions sinking.

On 4 June, UB-8 became the first submarine in the new Constantinople Flotilla based in Constantinople (present-day Istanbul). Despite German intentions to use her in the Dardanelles, UB-8 was ineffective because she was hampered by her limited torpedo supply and her weak engines, which made negotiating the strong currents there nearly impossible. Because of this, UB-8 was sent to patrol in the Black Sea, where she was active by late July.

An attack two days later on similar vessels was also unsuccessful.

In September, UB-7 and UB-8 were sent to Varna, Bulgaria, and from there, to patrol off the Russian Black Sea coast. Because Bulgaria had joined the Central Powers, battleships of the Russian Black Sea Fleet, and aircraft from the seaplane carriers  and  began attacks on Varna and the Bulgarian coast on 25 October. UB-7 and UB-8, both based out of Varna by this time, sortied to disrupt the bombardment. Despite the lack of any success by either submarine, their presence did cause the Russians to break off their attacks and withdraw.

In early 1916, UB-7 and UB-8 were still cruising in the Black Sea out of Varna. The Germans did not have good luck in the Black Sea, which was not a priority for them. The Bulgarians, who saw the value of the submarines in repelling Russian attacks, began negotiations to purchase UB-7 and UB-8. Bulgarian sailors practiced in the pair of boats and technicians were sent to Kiel for training at the German submarine school there. The transfer of UB-8 to the Bulgarian Navy took place on 25 May 1916, but for reasons unreported in sources, UB-7 remained under the German flag.

Bulgarian career 

Upon acceptance of UB-8 by the Bulgarian Navy, she was renamed Podvodnik No. 18 (in Cyrillic: Подводник №18). Although the commissioning ceremony for Podvodnik No. 18 was kept out of newspapers, it was attended by Crown Prince Boris and his brother Prince Kiril, who both boarded the submarine for a ceremonial first voyage to Euxinograd, the Bulgarian summer palace located just north of Varna. In Bulgarian service, the submarine was armed with a  deck gun that supplemented its machine gun.

Podvodnik No. 18s first patrol under the Bulgarian flag took place on 4 and 5 July 1916 when she sailed to Cape Shabla and Mangalia. The submarine was used for reconnaissance and coastal defense, and patrolled a regular route. This route was a loop that began in Varna and went northward to Kaliakra, Mangalia, and Constanţa; then southward to Burgas, and Sozopol; then ended at Varna. After the Russian withdrawal from World War I in 1917, Podvodnik No. 18s activities were greatly reduced.

After the end of the war, Podvodnik No. 18 was surrendered to the French on 23 February 1919. Towed to Bizerta, she was scrapped after August 1921.

Summary of raiding history

Notes

References

Bibliography 

 

 
 
 
 
 
 
 
 
 
 
 
 

German Type UB I submarines
Ships built in Kiel
Ships built in Pola
1915 ships
U-boats commissioned in 1915
World War I submarines of Germany
Submarines of the Bulgarian Navy
World War I submarines of Bulgaria